Sir Joseph Bampfylde Fuller  (20 March 1854 – 29 November 1935) was a British inventor, writer and first Lieutenant Governor of the new province of Eastern Bengal and Assam, knighted for his service in India.

Early life and career
Fuller studied at Marlborough College. In 1885, he began his Indian Civil Service career as the Commissioner of Settlements and Agriculture of Central Provinces. He became an Additional member of the Viceroy's Council in 1899. He served as Secretary to Government of India during the period 1901–02. He then served as Chief Commissioner of Assam during 1902–05.

Fuller held office as Lieutenant Governor of Eastern Bengal and Assam from 16 October 1905 until he resigned on 20 August 1906 to Lord Minto over the (British) Government of India's refusal to support reprisals against school agitators in Sirajganj.

In 1907, an abortive attempt was made by Yugantar Group on his life which he escaped unharmed. 

Fuller initiated the building of the Governor's residence in Dhaka, which became Old High Court Building, Dhaka. "Fuller Road", an important road at the heart of the University of Dhaka is named after him.

Fuller invented an anti-gas alarm widely used during World War I.

Published books 

 Studies of Indian Life and Sentiment (1910)
 The Empire of India (1913)
 Life and Human Nature (1914)
 The Science of Ourselves (1921)
 Causes and Consequences (1923) 
 The Law Within (1926)
 Etheric Energies (1928)
 Some Personal Experiences (1930)
 The Tyranny of the Mind (1935)

Legacy
Fuller's chikila (Chikila fulleri), a fossorial amphibian, is named for him.

References 

1854 births
1935 deaths
People educated at Marlborough College
British inventors
Knights Commander of the Order of the Star of India
Companions of the Order of the Indian Empire
Indian Civil Service (British India) officers